Meterana praesignis is a species of moth in the family Noctuidae. It was described by George Howes in 1911 from specimens collected in Orepuki in September and November. It is endemic to New Zealand.

References

External links

 Citizen science observations

Moths described in 1911
Moths of New Zealand
Hadeninae
Endemic fauna of New Zealand
Taxa named by George Howes (entomologist)
Endemic moths of New Zealand